Abu Bishr Isma'il ibn Ibrahim ibn Muqsim, commonly known as Ibn 'Ulayya, was a hadith scholar, faqih and a mufti from Basra.

References 

Hadith scholars
Sunni imams
Sunni Muslim scholars of Islam
8th-century Muslim scholars of Islam
Sunni fiqh scholars
People from Baghdad
729 births
809 deaths